Edson Marcelo da Silva Madeira (born 18 May 1985) is a Mozambican judoka, who competed in the half-lightweight division (66 kg). He achieved numerous fifth and seventh-place finishes at the African Championships within a span of five years. Madeira made his official debut at the 2008 Summer Olympics in Beijing, and qualified for the men's 66-kg division. He was eliminated in the first round, after being defeated by Dex Elmont of the Netherlands, who automatically scored an ippon.

References

External links
 
 NBC Olympic Profile

1985 births
Living people
Mozambican male judoka
Olympic judoka of Mozambique
Judoka at the 2008 Summer Olympics
African Games bronze medalists for Mozambique
African Games medalists in judo
Competitors at the 2007 All-Africa Games
Competitors at the 2011 All-Africa Games
Competitors at the 2015 African Games